Greektown station is a Detroit People Mover station in Downtown Detroit, Michigan.  It is located above Beaubien Street with an elevated walkway providing direct connection to the Hollywood Casino on the 3rd level (in the 500 block of East Lafayette Street), which was previously the Trappers Alley indoor shopping center.  

The station is named for the takes its name from the Greektown Historic District. This is the busiest station on the rail line, tallying ridership of 559,048 in 2014.

See also

 List of rapid transit systems
 List of United States rapid transit systems by ridership
 Metromover
 Transportation in metropolitan Detroit

References

External links
 DPM station overview
Monroe Street entrance from Google Maps Street View

Detroit People Mover stations
Railway stations in the United States opened in 1987
1987 establishments in Michigan
Greektown, Detroit